Hillested is a village located in the Lolland Municipality, in the Region Zealand of Denmark.

References 

Cities and towns in Region Zealand
Lolland Municipality